Hess or Heß, a German and Ashkenazic surname, meaning somebody originally from the region of Hesse.  Two alternative origins have been reported.  Usage in the south of Germany may arise from a contraction of the personal name Matthäus.

Notable people who share this surname include:

Adam Hess (born 1981), American basketball player
Adam  Hess (comedian), British comedian
Alexander Hess (1898–1981), Czechoslovak war pilot part of No. 310 Squadron RAF
András Hess, Hungarian printer
Beat W. Hess (born 1949), Swiss businessman
Bernhard Hess (born 1966), Swiss politician
Bernhard von Hess (1792–1869), Bavarian Lieutenant General and War Minister
Carl von Hess (1863–1923), German ophthalmologist
Catherina Hess, (born 1985), German actress
Damian Hess aka MC Frontalot, nerdcore rapper
Dean Hess (1917–2015), American Air Force Colonel
Derek Hess, (born 1964), American artist
Elizabeth Hess (born 1953), Canadian actress
Elmar Hess (born 1966), German artist
Eric Hess, American wrestler
Erika Hess (born 1962), Swiss alpine skier
Ernst Hess (1893–1917), German World War I flying ace
Fred Hess (1944–2018), American jazz musician
Fred Hess (Wisconsin) (1858–1925), American politician
Fred J. Hess (1848–1928), American politician
Germain Henri Hess (1802–1850), Russian-Swiss chemist
Greg Hess (born 1962), 16th president of Wabash College
Hans-Georg Hess (1923–2008), German U-boat captain
Harry Hammond Hess (1906–1969), American geologist
Harry Hess, American college sports coach
Harvey Hess (1939–2012), American lyric poet
Heinrich von Heß (1788–1870), Austrian fieldmarshall
Heinrich Maria von Hess, German painter
Hermann Hesse (1877–1962), German-born Swiss poet, novelist, and painter
Hieronymus Hess, Swiss drawer, painter, caricaturist (1799–1850)
Ilse Hess, German writer (1900–1995)
Jake Hess, American southern gospel vocalist
Jared Hess (born 1979), American writer and director of Napoleon Dynamite
Jean-Chrisostome Hess (1816–1900), French composer, pianist, and organist
Jessica Hess (born 1981), American realist painter
Johann Hess (Hesse), (1490–1547), German theologian 
John Jacob Hess (1584–1639), Swiss-German Anabaptist minister and martyr
Karl Hess (1923–1994), American speechwriter and author
Karl Hess (painter) (1801–1874), German painter
Leon Hess Founder of Hess Corporation and the New York Jets franchise
Lyle Hess, (1912-2002) American sailboat designer
Markus Hess, German hacker
Martin Hess (politician) (born 1971), German politician
Michael A. Hess (1952–1995), American lawyer
Moses Hess (1812–1875), Jewish philosopher and proto-Zionist
Myra Hess (1890–1965), British pianist
Nigel Hess, British composer
Ortwin Hess, British optician and physicist
Orvan Hess (1906–2002), doctor who invented the fetal heart monitor
Peter von Hess, German painter
Robert Hess (chess player), American chess grandmaster
Robert Hess (college president) (1938–1994), American President of Brooklyn College
Rudolf Hess (1894–1987), Deputy Führer of Nazi Germany
Rudolf Hess (artist) (1903–1986), Californian painter and art critic
Sara Whalen Hess Sara Whalen (born 1976), American Olympic soccer player
Ursula Hess (born 1946), Swiss archer
Ursula Hess (psychologist) (born 1960), German psychologist
Victor Francis Hess (1883–1964), Austrian-American physicist who discovered cosmic rays
W. Dale Hess (1930–2016), American politician
Walter Rudolf Hess (1881–1973), Swiss physiologist Nobel Prize winner
Willy Hess (composer) (1906–1997), Swiss musicologist, composer, Beethoven scholar
Willy Hess (violinist) (1859–1939), German famous violin virtuoso
Wolf Rüdiger Hess (Heß) (1937–2001), German architect son of Rudolf Hess

See also
Höss (surname)
Helius Eobanus Hessus (1488–1540), German Latin poet
The Hess Homestead
Hesse (surname)

Notes 

Ethnonymic surnames
German-language surnames
Jewish surnames
German toponymic surnames